is a professional Japanese baseball player. He plays pitcher for the Fukuoka SoftBank Hawks.

Professional career

Kagawa Olive Guyners

On December 13, 2012, Matayoshi signed with the Kagawa Olive Guyners of the independent league Shikoku Island League Plus.

On June 22, 2013, His shutout win against the Kochi Fighting Dogs caught the attention of the Chunichi Dragons scouts. In 2013 season, he finished the regular season with 24 Games pitched, a 13–4 Win–loss record, a 1.64 ERA, and a 101 strikeouts in 131.1 innings.

Chunichi Dragons
On October 24, 2013, Matayoshi was drafted  by the Chunichi Dragons in the 2013 Nippon Professional Baseball draft.

2014–2015 season
On March 29, 2014, Matayoshi debuted in the Central League against the Hiroshima Toyo Carp as a relief pitcher, and recorded Holds. On April 17, he pitched against the Yokohama DeNA BayStars and recorded his first win. In 2014 season, he finished the regular season with 67 Games pitched, a 9–1 Win–loss record, a 2.21 ERA, a 24 Holds, a 2 Saves, and a 104 strikeouts in 81.1 innings.

In 2015 season, Matayoshi finished the regular season with 63 Games pitched, a 6–6 Win–loss record, a 3.36 ERA, a 30 Holds, and a 82 strikeouts in 72.1 innings.

2016–2021 season
In 2016 season, Matayoshi broke the team record of pitching in at least 60 games for three consecutive seasons as a setup man. And he recorded a 62 Games pitched, a 6–6 Win–loss record, a 2.80 ERA, a 16 Holds, and a 55 strikeouts in 54.2 innings.

On April 27, 2017, he scored his first win as a starting pitcher against the Tokyo Yakult Swallows. On July 4, Matayoshi was the first pitcher from an independent league to be named an My navi All-Star Game 2017. In 2017 season, he finished the regular season with 50 Games pitched, a 8–3 Win–loss record, a 2.13 ERA, a 21 Holds, and a 78 strikeouts in 110 innings.

On August 9, 2018, he achieved his 100th career Holds against the Hiroshima Toyo Carp. In 2018 season, he finished the regular season with 40 Games pitched, a 2–5 Win–loss record, a 6.53 ERA, a 9 Holds, and a 28 strikeouts in 41.1 innings.

In 2019 season, Matayoshi finished the regular season with 26 Games pitched, a 3–3 Win–loss record, a 4.06 ERA, a 3 Holds, and a 37 strikeouts in 44.1 innings.

On June 27, 2020, Matayoshi was diagnosed with a left oblique muscle injury and recuperated. He returned to the mound on September 1 after two months of rehabilitation. In 2020 season, he finished the regular season with 26 Games pitched, a 4–0 Win–loss record, a 2.77 ERA, a 7 Holds, and a 18 strikeouts in 26 innings.

On July 16, 2021, Matayoshi was named an All-Star for the second time and pitched in My Navi All-Star Game 2021. In 2021 season, he had a career-high 33 holds in 66 games and recorded a 1.28 ERA, a 8 Saves, and a 41 strikeouts in 63.1 innings.

On November 29, he announced that he would exercise his free agent rights(:ja:フリーエージェント (日本プロ野球)).

Fukuoka SoftBank Hawks
On December 14, 2021, the Fukuoka SoftBank Hawks announced that they had signed Matayoshi to a four-year contract. His annual salary, including incentives, was estimated at 650 million yen in total for four years.

2022 season–present
On March 26, 2022, Matayoshi made his first start as a pitcher for the Hawks. On April 26, he became the ninth player in NPB history to reach 150 holds against the Saitama Seibu Lions. After that, he contributed to the team as a setup man, but on August 9, he was diagnosed with a broken right leg and spent the rest of the season in rehabilitation. In 2022 season, he finished the regular season with 31 Games pitched, a 3–3 Win–loss record, a 2.10 ERA, a 14 Holds, a one Saves, and a 22 strikeouts in 30 innings.

International career
On February 16, 2015, Matayoshi represented the Japan national baseball team at the GLOBAL BASEBALL MATCH 2015.

On October 12, 2017, he was selected as the Japan national baseball team in the 2017 Asia Professional Baseball Championship.

References

External links

 Career statistics - NPB.jp
 14 Katsuki Matayoshi PLAYERS2022 - Fukuoka SoftBank Hawks Official site

1990 births
Living people
Baseball people from Okinawa Prefecture
Japanese expatriate baseball players in the Dominican Republic
Nippon Professional Baseball pitchers
Chunichi Dragons players
Fukuoka SoftBank Hawks players
Tigres del Licey players